Malia Metella (born 23 February 1982 in Cayenne, French Guiana) is a French Olympic freestyle swimmer from French Guiana. She swam for France at the 2004 and 2008 Olympics, winning a silver medal in 2004 in the women's 50 free.

She won her first senior titles at the European Short Course Swimming Championships 2003 in Dublin, Ireland.

Her younger brother Mehdy Metella is also a world-class swimmer.

Achievements
2001: SC European Championships
 21st 50 m freestyle (25.89)
 21st 100 m butterfly (1:01.91)
2003: SC European Championships
1st 100 m freestyle (53.15)
3rd 50 m freestyle (24.54)
4th 100 m butterfly (58.42)
2004: LC European Championships
1st 100 m freestyle (54.46)
2nd 100 m butterfly (58.78)
1st 4×100 m freestyle relay (3:40.67)
1st 4×100 m medley relay (4:05.96)
2004: Olympic Games
2nd 50 m freestyle (24.89)
4th 100 m freestyle (54.50)
5th 4×100 m free relay (3:40.23)
2004: SC European Championships
1st 100 m freestyle (53.37)
3rd 100 m butterfly (58.47)
4th 50 m freestyle (24.71)
4th 4×50 m free relay (1:39.68)
5th 4×50 m medley relay (1:51.28)

References

1982 births
Living people
Sportspeople from Cayenne
French Guianan female swimmers
Olympic swimmers of France
Swimmers at the 2004 Summer Olympics
Swimmers at the 2008 Summer Olympics
French female freestyle swimmers
French female butterfly swimmers
Olympic silver medalists for France
French people of French Guianan descent
World Aquatics Championships medalists in swimming
European Aquatics Championships medalists in swimming
Medalists at the 2004 Summer Olympics
Olympic silver medalists in swimming
Mediterranean Games gold medalists for France
Mediterranean Games silver medalists for France
Swimmers at the 2001 Mediterranean Games
Swimmers at the 2009 Mediterranean Games
Mediterranean Games medalists in swimming